was the twenty-sixth of the fifty-three stations of the Tōkaidō. It is located in what is now the city of Kakegawa, Shizuoka Prefecture, Japan.

History
Kakegawa-juku was originally the castle town of Kakegawa Castle. It was famous because Yamauchi Kazutoyo rebuilt the area and lived there himself.

It also served as a post station along a salt road that ran through Shinano Province between the modern-day cities of Makinohara and Hamamatsu.

The classic ukiyo-e print by Andō Hiroshige (Hōeidō edition) from 1831–1834 depicts travelers crossing a trestle-bridge. An old couple is struggling against a strong wind, followed by a boy making a mocking gesture; another boy is watching a kite up in the air. In the background, peasants are planting rice and in the distance, Mount Akiba is shown in the mists.

Neighboring post towns
Tōkaidō
Nissaka-shuku - Kakegawa-juku - Fukuroi-juku

Further reading
Carey, Patrick. Rediscovering the Old Tokaido:In the Footsteps of Hiroshige. Global Books UK (2000). 
Chiba, Reiko. Hiroshige's Tokaido in Prints and Poetry. Tuttle. (1982) 
Taganau, Jilly. The Tokaido Road: Travelling and Representation in Edo and Meiji Japan. RoutledgeCurzon (2004).

References

Stations of the Tōkaidō
Stations of the Tōkaidō in Shizuoka Prefecture